is a German electro-industrial band founded in 1995 by DJ Felix and DJ Banane. Translated, der Feindflug (literally "the foe-flight") corresponds in military use to the French/English word "sortie".

Style and themes 
Feindflug's music is entirely instrumental. The only vocals that can be heard are in samples, mostly taken from movies dubbed in German or excerpts of Adolf Hitler or Klaus Kinski.

The band is characterized by Jeffrey Andrew Weinstock and Isabella van Elferen as martial industrial and neo-folk, "negotiating the role of the past in the present."  Recurring themes and topics are authoritarian regimes, the death-penalty and total war, especially World War II and the Third Reich.

Critics have associated the band with the German Neo-Nazi scene, due to the themes presented in their music and their album cover graphics. The band-members oppose this critique and have stated that their music is intended as a reflection of the issues it describes, not as support. The band's motto is "Use your brain and think about it!".

Career highlights 
In 1999, the band had their first official performance at the 8th  music festival in Leipzig, Germany.

In 2004, the band was invited to perform at the 13th  music festival in Leipzig, Germany.

In 2006, the band performed at the 15th  music festival in Leipzig, Germany.

In 2010, the band performed at the E-tropolis music festival in Berlin, Germany.

Website 
In 2006, the band's website's flash intro featured photographs of several German World War 2 scenes, an electric chair and President George W. Bush in between their song, .

Discography

Albums 
 Feindflug 'Erste Version' ("First version", CD-R, 1997), limited private release
  ("Second / Third version", CD-R, 1997), limited private re-release of above
  ("Fourth version", CD, 1999), re-release of above
  (CD, 2002)
  (CD, 2005)
  ("Third version", 2009), limited picture vinyl re-release

Singles and EPs 
 I. / St. G. 3 (MCD, 1998)
  (MCD, 1999)
  (EP, 2000)
 I. / St. G. 3 (Phase 2) (MCD, 2003, rerelease of 1998 version with 1 extra track)
 Kollaboration (Vinyl, 2004, only available on tour)

Video 
  (DVD, Boxset version available) (2006-06-05) features Live-clips, Bonusclips, Concertfilm and more.

Collaborative releases 
 Supreme Court feat. Feindflug – We'll F*** You Up!  (2006-02-24)

Feindflug's first official release, I. / St. G. 3, was released on the radical right-wing VAWS label. They say that they regret this, and didn't know what VAWS was about, but that no one else was willing to release their work due to the controversial name, imagery, and use of samples.

All subsequent releases have been made on the Black Rain label, but not without trouble. The Dutch producer for the  EP refused production because of explicit images of an execution with an electrical chair, and the Austrian producer for  refused production later because of the national-socialist accusations.

Sources

See also 

 List of electro-industrial bands

External links 
 Official website
Feindflug discography at Discogs
 

Electro-industrial music groups
Noise musical groups
Musical groups established in 1995
German industrial music groups